The 2007 Pan Arab Games football tournament was the 10th edition of the Pan Arab Games men's football tournament. The football tournament was held in Cairo, Egypt between 13–25 November 2007 as part of the 2007 Pan Arab Games. Egyptian team won the gold medal while Libya and Saudi Arabia took second and third place respectively.

Participating teams
The following countries have participated for the final tournament:

  
 
 
  B

Squads

Final tournament

Tournament classification

Matches

Scorers
5 goals
 Emad Motaeb

4 goals
 Osama Al Fazzani

2 goals
 Sayed Moawad

1 goal

 Hossam Ghaly
 Osama Hosny
 Ahmed Salama
 Omar Daoud
 Ali Rahuma
 Ahmad Sa'ad
 Yasser Al-Qahtani
 Omar Al-Ghamdi
 Redha Tukar
 Saud Kariri
 Mahmoud Hassan
 Abdullah Qasim
 Ismail Al-Hamaadi

Own Goal
 Obaid Khalifa (playing against Saudi Arabia)

References
 Pan Arab Games on Goalzz – Football

2007
football
2007–08 in Egyptian football
2007–08 in Libyan football
2007–08 in Saudi Arabian football
2007–08 in Emirati football
2007 in African football
2007 Pan Arab Games